The Apertura 2019 Liga MX championship stage commonly known as Liguilla (mini league) was played from 27 November 2019 to 29 December 2019. Due to finalist Monterrey participating in the 2019 FIFA Club World Cup, the final was postponed to 29 December from 15 December. A total of eight teams competed in the championship stage to decide the champions of the Apertura 2019 Liga MX season. Both finalists qualified to the 2021 CONCACAF Champions League.

Qualified teams
The following 8 teams qualified for the championship stage.

In the following table, the number of appearances, last appearance, and previous best result count only those in the short tournament era starting from Invierno 1996 (not counting those in the long tournament era from 1943–44 to 1995–96).

Format
Teams were re-seeded each round.
Team with more goals on aggregate after two matches advanced.
Away goals rule was applied in the quarter-finals and semi-finals, but not the final.
In the quarter-finals and semi-finals, if the two teams were tied on aggregate and away goals, the higher seeded team advanced.
In the final, if the two teams were tied after both legs, the match went to extra time and, if necessary, a shoot-out.
Both finalists qualified to the 2021 CONCACAF Champions League.

Bracket

Quarter-finals

|}

First leg

Second leg

Morelia won 5–4 on aggregate

Necaxa won 6–2 on aggregate

Monterrey won 6–3 on aggregate

América won 5–4 on aggregate

Semi-finals

|}

First leg

Second leg

Monterrey won 3–1 on aggregate

2–2 on aggregate. América advanced due to being the higher seed in the classification table

Finals

|}

First leg

Details

Statistics

Second leg

Details

3–3 on aggregate. Monterrey won 4–2 on penalties

Statistics

Statistics

Goalscorers

Assists
3 assists
 Jesús Angulo (Necaxa)

2 assists
 Jesús Gallardo (Monterrey)
 Luis Ángel Mendoza (Morelia)
 Rodrigo Millar (Morelia)
 Dorlan Pabón (Monterrey)
 Carlos Rodríguez (Monterrey)

1 assist
 Paul Aguilar (América)
 Ayron del Valle (Querétaro)
 Jesús Dueñas (UANL)
 Julio Furch (Santos Laguna)
 André-Pierre Gignac (UANL)
 Andrés Ibargüen (América)
 Renato Ibarra (América)
 Vincent Janssen (Monterrey)
 Henry Martín (América)
 José Martínez (Morelia)
 Roger Martínez (América)
 Kevin Mercado (Necaxa)
 Fernando Navarro (León)
 Iván Ochoa (León)
 Rodolfo Pizarro (Monterrey)
 Hugo Isaác Rodríguez  (Santos Laguna)
 Richard Sánchez (América)
 Diego Valdés  (Santos Laguna)
 Efraín Velarde (Morelia)

Notes

References

 
1
Liga MX seasons